Bigg Boss 3 is the third season of the Indian reality TV programme Bigg Boss. It began airing on 4 October 2009 on Colors TV with Amitabh Bachchan as the host and aired for 84 days concluding on 26 December 2009. Vindu Dara Singh won the show while Pravesh Rana was declared the first runner-up.

Shamita Shetty returned in Bigg Boss OTT and Bigg Boss 15

Housemates Status

Housemates
The participants in the order of appearance and entered in house are:

Original entrants

 Ismail Darbar – Singer and Music director. He is known for directing the songs of the hit film Hum Dil De Chuke Sanam starring Aishwarya Rai, Salman Khan and Ajay Devgan. He also produced the music of films like Devdas and Shakti: The Power.
 Sherlyn Chopra – Model and actress. She has appeared in Bollywood films like Dosti: Friends Forever and Raqeeb. She was crowned as Miss Andhra in 1999.
 Kamal Rashid Khan – Director and Bhojpuri film actor. He is known for his controversial statements on celebrities. 
 Poonam Dhillon – TV and film actress. She is a veteran Bollywood actress who appeared in many yesteryear films like Kabhi Ajnabi The, Qayamat and Main Aur Mera Haathi. She appeared in the hit Zee TV show Kittie Party.
 Bakhtiyaar Irani – Television actor. He is known for his role of Shiv in Lo Ho Gayi Pooja Iss Ghar Ki along with Sana Saeed. He also participated in the reality show Nach Baliye.
 Tannaz Irani – Actress, model. She is the wife of co contestant Bhakhtiyaar. She has appeared in many shows like Baa Bahoo Aur Baby and Nach Baliye. She was also seen in films like Mere Yaar Ki Shaadi Hai and Main Prem Ki Diwani Hoon and 36 China Town.
 Vindu Dara Singh – Actor. He is the son of wrestler and actor Dara Singh. He starred in films like Partner and Kambakkht Ishq.
 Aditi Gowitrikar – Actress, Model and Doctor. She earned the title of Miss World in 2001 and is also a former Gladrag Champion who completed her MBBS by education. She has appeared in films like Paheli and shows like Fear Factor: Khatron Ke Khiladi. 
 Jaya Sawant – Rakhi Sawant's mother.
 Shamita Shetty – Film actress and Model. She is the sister of Bollywood actress  Shilpa Shetty. She is known for her role in Mohabbatein as Ishika. She later appeared in films like Saathiya in song Choli Pe Choli, Mere Yaar Ki Shaadi Hai in song Sharara Sharara and Cash. 
 Claudia Ciesla – Model and actress. She is from Germany and has appeared in films like Karma. She later became popular for appearing in the song "Balma" in film Khiladi 786 after her appearance on Bigg Boss. 
 Rohit Verma – Fashion designer. He had decided to participate in Bigg Boss Season 3 which will help him to be more popular among the common people of India. He was also seen in the film Fashion along with Diandra Soares. 
 Raju Srivastav – Comedian. He was a popular comedian who had appeared in shows like The Great Indian Laughter Challenge and Comedy Circus. He also appeared in films like Baazigar, Tezaab and Maine Pyaar Kiya.

Wild card entrants
 Vinod Kambli – Cricketer. 
 Pravesh Rana – Model.

Guests in house

 Television actress Panchi Bora entered the house to spend 3 days as a guest.
Akshay Kumar entered the house in the second week for the promotion of his film Blue.
 Bhakhtiyar's son Zeus Irani entered the Big Boss House in week 7 to spend some time with Bhakhtiyaar on the latter's birthday.
Akshay Kumar, Sunil Shetty, Sameera Reddy and rest of the De Dana Dan team entered the Big Boss House on 54th Day and spent time with the housemates. Akshay Kumar carried letters from the housemates from their families.
After being ejected for his behaviour, Kamal Rashid Khan re-entered the house as a guest for three more weeks without letting the housemates know that he was actually a guest, not a wild card entry.

Weekly Summary

Highlights

Week 1
 
 Day 5: Vindu and Bhakhtyar's fight almost came to blows over spilled milk in the Gym area. Vindu took offense when Bhakhtyar asked him to clean the spillage, assuming that Vindu created the mess.
 Kamal shouted at Poonam, Kamal felt she was referring to him when she said 'some' people are shameless and turn up at the table to eat without helping in the kitchen.

Week 2
 Kamal went on a hunger strike claiming that he would not eat or drink until Claudia says "I Love You" to him. After a day Big Boss set off the alarm in the middle of night when Kamal was trying to have food secretly.
 Kamal and Bhakhtyar were sent to jail, as they were found without their mikes for several hours.

Week 3
 Day 18: Kamal hit Rohit Verma with a bottle which hits Shamita instead and went on to fight with Raju Srivastav for supporting Rohit. Kamal used highly offensive language, swearing at Raju and Rohit. Kamal was ejected from the house after all the fellow contestants started revolting against him for physical fights.
Rohit was chatting with Shamita when he said he wasted some points last day for some unworthy performances (ref - Day 16:Tasks), and that he assumed he donated those points for charity and will get over it. Kamal took offense and threw a bottle at Rohit. Raju opined that Kamal should have talked to him if felt bad about the remark, hitting Rohit was not called for. Big boss called Kamal to the confession room and advised him to calm down. The housemates were not happy about no action being taken on Kamal. They planned to leave the house if no action was taken against him. Kamal was subsequently thrown out of the house for such violent behaviour.

Week 4
 Day 22: Rohit was not allowed to speak. Shamita was asked to interpret Rohit's actions and convey the message in Hindi language only, failing which both would be jailed. They will have to continue until Big boss orders them to stop.

Week 5
 Day 31: After watching the first part of the short film 'Agar, Magar, Lekin', Big Boss declared it to be a flop. Housemates were given a second chance to prepare a better film with good story, music and typical Hindi film masala.
 Day 32: Aditi was sent to jail by Shamita on account of speaking in English. Second short film 'Milke Judaa Na Hon' prepared by the housemates was appreciated by Big Boss and was thus declared a Superhit.

Week 6
 Day 35: Pravesh and Claudia were sent to jail (for one day) by Bigg Boss as they were found talking in English for a long time.
 Day 36: Bigg Boss declared that Shamita did not justify the role of 'Mahanideshak' and with the consent of housemates Raju was chosen as the new 'Mahanideshak'.

Week 7
 Day 43: Bigg Boss banned Vindu, Rohit and Raju from nomination on basis of planning and plotting. For the first time Six housemates are nominated for eviction.
 Day 44: Vindu, Raju and Rohit were punished for discussing nominations and plotting against other housemates.

Vindu Dara Singh was sent to the jail. Raju Srivastav was asked to spend his day on a floating bed in the Swimming Pool. Rohit suffered the most, as he was put inside a cage like a bird. The cage was lifted in the air by a crane. They were prohibited from talking to each other.

 Day 46: Claudia and Pravesh were ordered by Bigg Boss not to speak each other as they were caught talking in English multiple times. Kamal re-enters the Bigg Boss house on wild card entry this week. Bakhtiyar is badmouthing Claudia. Bakhtiyar cries.

Week 8
 Day 52: On the basis of Dr. Poonam's analysis (in the weekly task of mental asylum), Aditi's and Claudia's roles of patient and nurse respectively, were interchanged. Big Boss showed Rohit's video this time capturing his nicer side. Bakhtiyar keeps repeating that he is wanting Vindu and Raju out of the show.

Week 9
 Day 57 Bhaktiyaar is safe from being nominated. Raju nominated Bhaktiyar to be safe but Bhaktiyar nominated against Raju. Kamal being a guest does not have the right to nominate or get nominated.
 Poonam, Raju, Aditi, Bakhtiyaar and Pravesh are sent to jail for rules that were broken by housemates while they were the prime ministers of the house. Housemates break rules to ensure that all go to jail one by one and so that its fair to everyone.

Week 10
 Day 62: Kamal has a sudden bout of depression and suffers high blood pressure
 Day 67: Kamal Khan left the house.
 Day 68: Claudia is evicted from the house and Vindu Dara Singh has been sent to a secret room in the house where he can watch the other contestants.

Week 11
 Day 71: Bakhtyaar is already nominated as he got a hand-grenade from Vindu; Vindu, Aditi, and Poonam are also nominated for this week
 Day 77: Aditi is evicted from the house.

Week 12
 Day 78: Baktiyaar left the house in the final week when Big Boss offered any one contestant to take 1 million rupees and leave the show if he is insecure about his victory. Baktiyaar accepted the offer and took the money and left the house. Now the three finalists are Poonam Dhillon, Pravesh Rana and Vindu Dara Singh. The hand grenade, given by Aditi to Bakhtiyar, is transferred to Pravesh.
 Day 79: Pravesh tries to excite Vindu by asking him that why is he acting fake, and throws all the food in the swimming pool.
 Day 81: Pravesh has taken an oath for not drinking water and eating food as a penance for throwing food in the pool.
 Day 84: Vindu wins the car and wins the final of Bigg Boss-Season 3.

Nominations table

References

External links 
 Bigg Boss 4 Official Website

2009 Indian television seasons
03